Nazarabad (also Romanized as Naz̧arābād) is a village in Meshkan Rural District, Meshkan District, Khoshab County, Razavi Khorasan Province, Iran. At the 2006 census, its population was 197, in 38 families.

References 

Populated places in Khoshab County